Howard Margolis (1932 – April 29, 2009) was an American social scientist. He earned a BA in Government from Harvard University in 1953 and a PhD in Political Science from MIT in 1979. From 1990 to 2009, he was on the faculty of the University of Chicago and taught as well at the University of Chicago's Harris School of Public Policy Studies.

His work on social theory focuses on individual choice and judgments shaping aggregate social outcomes and involved mathematical modeling.  Margolis also published extensively on cognition, public policy, and the history of science.

Bibliography
 Margolis, Howard (2007). Cognition and Extended Rational Choice. New York: Routledge.
 Margolis, Howard (2002). It Started with Copernicus: How Turning the World Inside Out Led to the Scientific Revolution. McGraw-Hill.
 Margolis, Howard (1996). Dealing with Risk: Why Expert and Lay Intuition Conflict, and What Might Be Done about It'. University of Chicago Press.
 Margolis, Howard (1993). Paradigms and Barriers: How Habits of Mind Govern Scientific Belief. University of Chicago Press.
 Margolis, Howard (1987). Patterns, Thinking, and Cognition: A Theory of Judgment. University of Chicago Press.
 Margolis, Howard (1982). Selfishness, Altruism, and Rationality: A Theory of Social Choice''. Cambridge Press.

References

1932 births
2009 deaths
American social scientists
Harvard University alumni
University of Chicago faculty
MIT School of Humanities, Arts, and Social Sciences alumni